Voluntary Socialism is a work of nonfiction by the American mutualist Francis Dashwood Tandy (1867–1913). First published in 1896, it has been favorably cited by many individualist anarchists, including Clarence Lee Swartz, minarchist Robert Nozick and left-libertarian Roderick T. Long, who has noted that "many of the standard moves in market anarchist theory today are already in evidence in Tandy".

Tandy was a member of the "Denver Circle", a group of men who associated with Benjamin Tucker and contributed to the periodical Liberty. In the preface to Voluntary Socialism, he declares his intent to "give a complete outline of [Voluntaryism] in its most important bearings". To that end, chapters one through four outline the foundation for Tandy's anarchism, drawing heavily from Max Stirner and Herbert Spencer. Chapters five through fourteen cover specific areas of interest, including private defense agencies, the labor theory of value, mutual banking, transportation, and political strategy.

The book is dedicated to Benjamin Tucker, "whose lucid writings and scathing criticisms have done so much to dispel the clouds of economic superstition".

See also
 Voluntaryism
 List of books about anarchism

References

External links
 Voluntary Socialism – full text

Individualist anarchism
1896 non-fiction books
Books about anarchism
Books about socialism
Mutualism (economic theory)
Political books
Types of socialism